Nedungottur is a small village located in western part of Palakkad District, in the state of Kerala. Situated along the Bank of famous river Kunthippuzha(Thoothappuzha). It is divided into the Palakkad and Malappuram Districts. NEDUNGOTTUR is a Special grade Ward in THIRUVEGAPPURA Panchayath.Flora fantasia park is situated just oppsit of side of kundhi river

Geography

Nedungottur is well known of its cultural importance. Situated in the bank of river THUTHA (Also known as KUNDHI), East end of the village is EDALLAPALM and south and West end is KAIPPURAM. Nedungottur is situated in THIRUVEGAPPURA Grama Panchayath, PATTAMBI Mandalam, Ottappalam Thaluk Palakkad District.

Naranath Bhranthan
Nedungottur is famous for Kaippuram village where the hill of Naranath Bhranthan continues to attract visitors who wants to remember the antics of the madman in the Malayalam classics.

References

Villages in Palakkad district